Moon Kook-hyun (Korean: 문국현, Hanja: 文國現, born 12 January 1949) is the leader of the Creative Korea Party, who served as a well-known business manager and civil environmental campaigner in South Korea before entering his political career.

Born in Seoul, Moon studied English language at the Hankuk University of Foreign Studies, graduating with a BA in 1972, then took a postgraduate course in Business Administration at the Seoul National University.

As a Business Leader 
Moon began his career at Yuhan-Kimberly(유한킴벌리), a company manufacturing paper and woven fibre products. In 1983, he spent a year in the United States, taking some new management concepts. On his return, he developed the concept of "environmental management", focusing on digital printing technologies and the use of recycled paper.

In 1995, Moon became Chief Executive Officer of Yuhan-Kimberly.  In 1996, Moon was appointed committee director of the U.N. Environment (UNEP) Korea Development Organization. Faced with a financial crisis in 1997, he developed a new shift system where workers worked twelve-hours shifts for four days running, then took four days off.

2007 Presidential Election
In August 2007, Moon resigned from Yuhan-Kimberly to run in the 2007 South Korean presidential election. In October, he formed the Creative Korea Party, with an anti-corruption, pro-environmentalist program, gaining a bit of support from liberal voters who supported the Participatory Government, conservative voters who wanted to change the government and liked a similar 'business leader' portfolio but disliked Lee Myung-bak, and from the labor movement.

In the election, Moon won 5.8% of the votes for fourth place. Moon is a Roman Catholic.

2008 Legislative Election
On April 9, 2008, Moon beat the close confidante of Lee Myung-bak (president) Lee Jae-oh (GNP, Incumbent), by more than 11%. Although the harsh loss of South Korean liberal candidates especially in Seoul at this 2008 election, his campaign against 'the Grand Korean Canal' project boosted his popularity in his electoral division and across the nation. However, he lost his seat after a year (2009.10.22) due to his party members gaining profit illegally by confidential information. The court sentenced him 8 months. In the 2010 re-election for his empty seat, Lee Jae-oh easily regained his seat by 58.33%.

References

External links 
 Official Homepage 
 Official Mini-homepage(at Cyworld) 
 Official Weblog(at Naver.com) 
Grassroot Organizations
 MoonHamDae; Koreans with Moon, Civil Supporter`s Club 

1949 births
Living people
People from Seoul
South Korean businesspeople
South Korean Roman Catholics
South Korean environmentalists
Members of the National Assembly (South Korea)
Creative Korea Party politicians
Hankuk University of Foreign Studies alumni
The Asia Foundation